Kersten Neisser (later Köpke and then Kriesel, born 4 May 1956 in Halle, Saxony-Anhalt) is a German rower.

References

External links
  

1956 births
Living people
East German female rowers
Sportspeople from Halle (Saale)
Rowers at the 1980 Summer Olympics
Olympic gold medalists for East Germany
Olympic rowers of East Germany
Olympic medalists in rowing
World Rowing Championships medalists for East Germany
Medalists at the 1980 Summer Olympics